Mathers is an English surname and may refer to:

 Edward Peter Mathers (1850–1924), British journalist and newspaper proprietor
 Edward Powys Mathers (1892–1939), British translator and poet
 George Mathers, 1st Baron Mathers (1886–1965), Scottish politician
 "Helen Mathers", pen-name of English author Ellen Buckingham Mathews (1853–1920)
 Frank Mathers (1924–2005), Canadian hockey player and member of the Hockey Hall of Fame
 James Mathers (disambiguation)
 Jerry Mathers (born 1948), American actor
 Marshall Bruce Mathers III (born 1972), birth name of Eminem, American rapper, songwriter, producer, artist and actor
 Moina Mathers (1865–1928), artist and occultist, wife of Samuel Liddell MacGregor Mathers
 Mojo Mathers (born 1966), New Zealand politician
 Paul Mathers (born 1970), Scottish footballer and coach
 Peter Mathers (1931–2004), Australian author and playwright
 Richard Mathers (born 1983), English rugby league player
 Samuel Liddell MacGregor Mathers (1854–1918), English co-founder of the Hermetic Order of the Golden Dawn
 Noel Martin Mathers (Born 1969), Irish Chartered Surveyor and musician born in Northern Ireland

See also 

 Mather (disambiguation)